Leigh "Wiki" H. Royden is an American Geologist.

Early life 
Royden was born in Palo Alto, California. Royden's father was Halsey Royden, a mathematician.

Education 
Royden received an A.B. degree in physics from Harvard University and a PhD in geology and geophysics from the Massachusetts Institute of Technology (MIT).

Career 
Royden became a member of the faculty at MIT in 1988. She is director of MIT's Experimental Study Group.

Royden has published important papers on thermal subsidence at the northeastern continental margin of North America and on retreating subduction boundaries formed during the collision of continental tectonic plates.

In 1990, she was awarded the Donath Medal (Young Scientist Award) by the Geological Society of America. Royden was named a fellow of the American Geophysical Union in 2004. In 2011, she received the George P. Woollard Award. In 2018, she was named to the American Academy of Arts and Sciences.

References 

Year of birth missing (living people)
Living people
American geologists
American geophysicists
Women geophysicists
Harvard University alumni
Massachusetts Institute of Technology School of Science alumni
Massachusetts Institute of Technology School of Science faculty
Fellows of the American Geophysical Union
Fellows of the American Academy of Arts and Sciences